"Stylechanger" is a song by Swedish-American singer-songwriter Eric Turner, featuring Canadian rapper Kardinal Offishall and British rappers Wretch 32 and Professor Green. The song was released as Turner's second solo single in the United States on February 24, 2012. It was made available as part of a mixtape/EP containing seven other tracks.

Background
"Stylechanger" was written by Turner, Professor Green, Wretch 32, Kardinal Offishall and "iSHi" Mughal, and produced by the latter. The song was first leaked online on January 4, 2012, before being officially released on February 24, 2012. The music video was also released on January 4, 2012. The video was directed by P.R. Brown. The video features Turner performing the song at various scenes, including on the Hollywood Walk of Fame, inside a recording studio and in the main showroom of an art gallery. Professor Green, Wretch 32 and Kardinal Offishall all make cameo appearances in the video, performing their respective parts of the song.

Track listing

Release history

References

2011 songs
2012 singles
Professor Green songs
Wretch 32 songs
Kardinal Offishall songs
Songs written by Kardinal Offishall
Songs written by Professor Green
Capitol Records singles
Songs written by Eshraque "iSHi" Mughal
Songs written by Eric Turner (singer)
Songs written by Wretch 32